Jairo Quinteros Sierra (born 7 February 2001) is a Bolivian professional footballer who plays as a defender for Segunda División club Real Zaragoza and the Bolivia national team.

Club career
Born in Santa Cruz, Bolivia, Quinteros began his career at the youth academy of La Liga side Valencia. After spending a few years in Spain, on February 12, 2020, Quinteros signed with Inter Miami in Major League Soccer. After signing with the club he was immediately loaned out to Club Bolívar in his native Bolivia's Primera División.

Quinteros made his professional debut for Club Bolívar on February 27 against Real Santa Cruz. He started and played the entire match as Bolívar won 4–2.

On 16 August 2022, Quinteros and Miami mutually agreed to terminate his contract with the club. On 1 September, he returned to Spain after signing a two-year deal with Segunda División side Real Zaragoza.

International career
Quinteros has represented Bolivia at the under-20 and under-23 levels. On 2 January 2019, Quinteros was selected as part of the Bolivia U20 side for the 2019 U-20 Sudamericano. He played every match as Bolivia finished last in their group. He represented the senior Bolivia national team in a 3–1 2022 FIFA World Cup qualification win over Venezuela on 3 June 2021.

Career statistics

Club

References

External links
Profile at the Inter Miami website

2001 births
Living people
People from Santa Cruz de la Sierra
Bolivian footballers
Bolivia international footballers
Bolivian people of African descent
Bolivia youth international footballers
Association football defenders
Inter Miami CF players
Inter Miami CF II players
Club Bolívar players
Real Zaragoza players
Bolivian Primera División players
Bolivian expatriate footballers
2021 Copa América players
Expatriate soccer players in the United States
Major League Soccer players
MLS Next Pro players